Ad-Dawr is a small agricultural town in Saladin Governorate, Iraq, near Tikrit. It includes a great number of people from 4 tribes, al-Shuwaykhat, al-Mawashet, al-Bu Haydar and al-Bu Mdallal. Al-Mawashet tribe is famous for supporting Saddam Hussein.

History

Structures
Ad-Dawr is home to a housing complex called "Saad 14", which was built in the 1980s by Hyundai Engineering & Construction, a major South Korean construction company.

Iraq War
In May 2003, the 4th Battalion, 42nd Field Artillery, a part of the United States Army's 4th Infantry Division, along with the 534th Signal Company, established a Forward Operating Base just south of the town, called FOB Arrow. On May 15, 2003, troops from the U.S. Army's 4th Infantry Division raided the town, arresting more than 260 suspected Baath Party supporters. 

The vast majority were soon released but five Iraqi special security forces officers were reported captured, including two Iraqi army generals and a general from Saddam's security forces who had disguised himself as a shepherd. 

On August 13, 2003, a U.S. Army soldier was killed near FOB Arrow when his vehicle hit an anti-tank mine.

An attack near ad-Dawr killed three American soldiers and injured three on September 18, 2003.

The 4th Battalion 42nd Field Artillery, along with 3rd Platoon 534th Signal Company, adopted Nasiba Primary School for Girls in the town and completed its refurbishment in November 2003.

On December 13, 2003, the 4th Infantry Division's 1st Brigade Combat Team conducted Operation Red Dawn and found Saddam Hussein hiding in a spider hole in front of a hut occupied by a man believed to be his former cook, Qais Namuk.

Notables from ad-Dawr
• Izzat Ibrahim al-Douri

• One of the most well-known Arab historical scholars, Professor-Doctor Abdul Aziz Al-Douri (b. 1918 – d. 2010), was a native of ad-Dawr; he served as the chancellor of Baghdad University during the 1960s..

See also
 List of places in Iraq
List of United States Military installations in Iraq
Al-Awja

Links and references 
 Aldor map coordinates: 
 Map and satellite imagery showing ad-Dawr and environs - GlobalSecurity.org

References 

Dawr
District capitals of Iraq
Cities in Iraq